Bernard Leslie Barker (22 April 1913 – 31 January 1976) was a British philatelist who was added to the Roll of Distinguished Philatelists in 1969.

Barker was a specialist in the stamps and postal history of Belgium, a member of the Académie de Philatélie de Belgique, and president of the Lincoln Philatelic Society and the Belgian Study Circle.

References
 

Signatories to the Roll of Distinguished Philatelists

1913 births
1976 deaths
British philatelists
Philately of Belgium